Benjamin Faulks (born 13 March 1979) is a British actor and presenter. He is best known for co-creating the CBeebies television series Mr Bloom's Nursery. 

He was educated at Richard Lander School, St. Austell College and Bretton Hall School of Dance & Drama (now part of the University of Leeds) where he earned a degree in theatre acting. He currently works as an actor, author, presenter, producer and writer.

External links

Manchester Evening News
Guardian coverage

1979 births
Living people
English male television actors